Deltaspis ivae is a species of beetle in the family Cerambycidae. It was described by Beierl & Barchet-Beierl in 1999.

References

Deltaspis
Beetles described in 1999